Trinity Classical School is a private, classical Christian school offering college-preparatory, Christian education for grades pre-Kindergarten through Twelfth Grade in Houston, Texas. The school is one of approximately 25 University-style (or "blended model") schools in Texas.

Trinity Classical School is an accredited member of the Association of Classical and Christian Schools and the Classical Latin School Association. The school has also been a member of the National Association of University-Model Schools. The school offers a classical curriculum and students attend classes on campus two days per week, with instruction continuing at home on the other three days of the week. Students are able to participate in fine arts electives, classes in Latin and Greek, as well as service projects.  This hybrid model of education combines aspects of private and home schooling, resulting in greater parental participation and lower tuition fees.

Trinity Classical School is a non-profit organization and has received 501(c)(3) designation. The school receives no state or federal funding. Tuition for the 2023-24 school year for all grades is $2,325 per semester ($4,650 per year). Books and tuition are purchased separately. The school offers two types of scholarships: need-based and ministerial.

Campuses
Trinity Classical School has four campus locations.
 Heights Lower Campus (PK-4th Grade) at Heights Church, 230 W. 20th St, Houston, TX 77008
 Memorial Lower Campus (PK-4th Grade) at Bethel Church, 825 Bering Dr., Houston, TX 77057
 Memorial Middle Campus (5th-8th Grade) at Chinese Baptist Church 900 Brogden, Houston, TX  77024 (Hunters Creek Village)
 Memorial Upper Campus (9th-12th Grade) at Houston’s First Baptist Church 7401 Katy Fwy, Houston, TX 77024

Academics
The Classical Core is the fundamental TCS academic offering consisting of Language Arts, History, Science, Math, Music, and Classical Languages. These subjects are integrated and each subject is approached differently to correlate with the stage in the classical trivium that it is being taught (i.e., Grammar, Logic, or Rhetoric).

A Senior Thesis is a prerequisite for graduation. Every TCS 12th Grade student researches, writes, revises, and submits a thesis that combines aspects of a classic text, Biblical truth, and modern-day relevance. Each student present and defends his or her thesis in front of a panel of judges.

Student life

Co-curricular Activities
In the Primer, Grammar, and Logic years (Grades PK through 8th) students participate in a range of activites to supplement and reinforce their on-campus and at-home studies. These activities include field trips, book parties, history and science presentations, and theater performances.

At the Logic and Rhetoric grade levels (Grades 5 through 12) students may choose to participate in the annual Poetry Slam, Music Night, and Noctua Poetica (an annual compilation of student poetry).
For all Rhetoric School students (Grades 9 through 12), the schools sponsors the Trinity Ball, an annual formal dinner and dance.

House System
In 2013, TCS adopted a House System whereby each student in seventh grade and up is randomly placed into a House. Students are placed into one of four houses: Maxwell, Kepler, Pascal, and Carver. Each house is named after a notable scientist who held strong Christian beliefs. Each house has its own projects, crest, necktie colors, Latin motto, service projects, and traditions. Houses compete each year for the House Cup.

An example of a House Projects is Maxwell House's Last Drop, which produces weekly newsletters with historical, satirical, devotional, or comical articles.

Athletics
TCS sponsors a cross-country team, which is open to students in Grades 5 and up. During the Fall, the team competes in invitational meets across the Houston area. During the Winter, the team trains for a half-marathon. In Spring, the team competes in 5K road races sponsored by Houston-area charities.
The school also sponsors intramural Ultimate Frisbee teams during the Fall semester.

Fine Arts
Choir and choral instruction are included in the curriculum for all students. Each grade performs a choral selection twice each year at the closing Semester Celebrations in December and May. The school offers Fine Art electives for all grades, including a Fine Arts Primer in music and visual art for grades PreK and Kindergarten, Theater and dramatic arts classes for Grades 1 through 4, and a range of Eloquium classes (theater tools and skills, drawing, journalism, poetry and short stories) for Grades 5 and up.

Rome Trip
Juniors take a trip to Rome in the Spring to investigate Roman culture, language, history, architecture, religion, and art. Students are led by experienced faculty members who guide the trip.

Extracurricular Activities
Due to the school's hybrid schedule with 2 days on-campus per week, many families choose to participate with their school friends in outside activities, classes, and teams. These activities are not sponsored by the school, but provide opportunities for students in the following areas:
 Athletics (baseball, basketball, gymnastics, lacrosse, soccer, swimming, volleyball)
 Academics (Spanish, Mandarin Chinese, Tutoring)
 Enrichment (American Heritage, Chess, Scouting, Duke TIP, Computer Programming)
 Fine Arts (Dance, Guitar, Piano, Violin, Voice)

College Acceptances
TCS seniors have been accepted into the following colleges, universities, and programs:

Private Research Universities (Carnegie Classification R1)
 Baylor University (Honors)
 California Institute of Technology
 Carnegie Mellon University
 Rice University

Public Research Universities (Carnegie Classification R1)
 Colorado School of Mines
 Louisiana State University 
 Texas A&M University (Honors)
 Texas Tech University
 U. of Arkansas
 U. of Colorado - Boulder
 U. of Houston (Honors)
 U. of Oklahoma - Norman
 U. of Texas - Austin (Plan II Honors Program)
 Virginia Tech University

Private Colleges & Universities
 Abilene Christian University
 Asbury University 
 Austin College
 Belmont University (Honors)
 Boyce College
 Dallas Baptist University
 Grove City College
 Houston Christian U., formerly Houston Baptist U. (Honors) 
 Letourneau University (Honors)
 Lipscomb University (Honors)
 Oral Roberts University (Honors)
 St. John’s College
 Samford University (University Fellows)
 Southwestern University
 Texas Christian University
 Trinity University
 The King’s College
 University of St. Thomas
 Wheaton College

Public Colleges & Universities
 Blinn College
 Texas A&M University - Galveston
 U. of Texas - San Antonio 
 U. of Wyoming

References

External links
 Trinity Classical School of Houston
 ACCS website
 Classical Latin School Association
 National Association of University Model Schools

Christian schools in Houston
Christianity in Houston
Private K-12 schools in Harris County, Texas
High schools in Harris County, Texas
Preparatory schools in Texas
Educational institutions established in 2009
Private high schools in Houston
2009 establishments in Texas
Classical Christian schools